La Fuensanta is a portrait painting by Spanish artist Julio Romero de Torres depicting Maria Teresa López González, one
of Torres' models. Gonzalez is depicted with her arms resting on a copper cauldron. The painting was made in the autumn of 1929, when Torres completed another two artworks, La Chiquita Piconera and Bodegas Cruz Conde.

Born in Argentina, González moved with her family to Torres' native town of Córdoba after World War I. Since she first sat for Torres at the age of fourteen, González became one of his favourite models whose likeness is most closely associated to Torres. The painting is considered a quintessential rendition of Andalusian beauty, and became imbedded in the Spanish national conscience during the 25 years of its depiction on the 100 peseta banknote.

Provenance
The provenance of La Fuensanta has been largely unknown since 1930, when it was exhibited at the Ibero-American Exposition in Seville. In 1994, the painting was bought by an Argentine citizen. In November 2007, La Fuensanta was sold by Sotheby's to a private buyer. The Spanish Ministry of Culture tried to purchase the painting from Sotheby's, but the auction price of 1,173,400 euros was too high.

References

1929 paintings
20th-century portraits
Portraits by Spanish artists
Portraits of women
Paintings by Julio Romero de Torres